This is a list of avant-garde and experimental films released in the 1990s.

Notes 

1990s
Avant-garde